The Sheriff of Madras was an apolitical titular position of authority bestowed for one year on a prominent citizen of Madras. The post was abolished in 1998.

The position of Sheriff of Madras was created in the Madras Charter of 1726 which came into force on 17 August 1727. As the executive arm of the Jurisdiction the Sheriff was sworn in for a period of one year to carry out such duties as the summoning of people to the High Court, the provision of jurors, the attaching and sealing of properties and, if required, the arranging of their auction. The Sheriff had an office and staff and in the order of precedence ranked just below the Mayor. From the mid-1800s the position lost its powers and responsibilities and became primarily ceremonial.

Mumbai (Bombay) and Kolkata (Calcutta) continue (2017) to maintain their similar posts.

Some Sheriffs of Madras

1727 August Nicholas Morse, first Sheriff
1746-53 No Sheriffs
1770 Hon Edward Monckton
1776 Hon Basil Cochrane
1779 William Jackson
1805 John Oakes
1824 John Savage
1828 George Lys
1831 Patrick Grant
1843-45 John Bruce Norton
1845: John Findley McKennie
1846 Leonard Cooper, solicitor (died 1852)
1854 Captain Christopher Biden
1885-86 John Henry Taylor
1886, 1887 Rajah Sir Savilai Ramaswamy Mudaliar, 158th Sheriff of Madras and first Indian Sheriff
1888, 1889 Abel Joshua Higginbotham, bookseller
1892 Pundi Runganadha Mudaliar, writer, educationist and politician
1893 Cawasji Edulji Panday, first Parsi Sheriff
1896 Nawab Syed Muhammad Bahadur, first Muslim Sheriff
1909 December 07 -  Rao Bahadur M. Venkatasawmy Naidu Garu 
1922 Muthiah Chettiar, banker 
1924 December 20 to 1925 December 19 - Dewan Bahadur Saravana Bhavanandam Pillai, playwright 
1925 December 20 - C.E.Wood 
193n William Wallace Ladden, businessman
1933 Khan Bahadur Mohammed Musa Sait, businessman
1935 Ghulam Mohiuddin Khan Bahadur, 6th Prince of Arcot
1938 Ganapathi Agraharam Annadhurai Ayyar Natesan
1940 December 20 -Diwan Bahadur V. Shanmuga Mudaliyar 
1949-50 R. Ramanathan Chettiar, member of Lok Sabha
1952 P.V.S. Vencatachellum, businessman
1955-56 R.E. Castell
1956-57 Mrs Mary Clubwala Jadhav
1961 R.M. Dave, philanthropist and mayor
1964 T.S. Narayanaswami, industrialist
1967-1968 Maruthai Pillai, industrialist
1969-70 Anantharamakrishnan Sivasailam, industrialist
1973-74 A.M. Buhari, restaurateur
1974-75 Rangaswami Ramakrishnan
1978 A.B. Ananthakrishnan
1980-81 Dr.P.M.Rex
1983 Sarojini Varadappan, social worker
1984-85 Nawab Muhammed Abdul Ali 
1988 Nawab Muhammed Abdul Ali 
1989-91 Narayanaswami Srinivasan, industrialist
1992-93 Suresh Krishna, businessman
1997 K. Chockalingam, surgeon (last sheriff)

See also
Sheriff of Mumbai
Sheriff of Kolkata

References

External links
 Sheriffs from 1727 to 1800

Government of Chennai
 
Titles of national or ethnic leadership